Kaslink Foods Ltd, founded in the year of 2001, is a Finnish dairy company based in Kouvola, Finland. The company specializes in milk and cream-based products, as well as a variety of sauces and sauce bases. 

Kaslink is the largest privately-owned dairy business in Finland.

Sources 
 Kaslink Foodsin vuosikertomus 
 2012 Kaslink Foodsin Internetsivut

References 

Food and drink companies of Finland
Finnish brands